Clay Township is one of fifteen townships in Wayne County, Indiana, United States. As of the 2010 census, its population was 1,169 and it contained 445 housing units.

History
Clay Township was organized in 1832.

Geography
The streams of Our Run and Pale Run pass through this township.

Cities and towns
 Greens Fork

Unincorporated towns
(This list is based on USGS data and may include former settlements.)

Adjacent townships
 Green Township (northeast)
 Center Township (southeast)
 Harrison Township (southwest)
 Jefferson Township (west)
 Perry Township (northwest)

Cemeteries
The township contains two cemeteries: Fairfield and Greens Fork.

Major highways
 Indiana State Road 38

References
 
 United States Census Bureau cartographic boundary files

External links
 Indiana Township Association
 United Township Association of Indiana

Townships in Wayne County, Indiana
Townships in Indiana